Funatsu (written: 舩津, 船津 or ふなつ in hiragana) is a Japanese surname. Notable people with the surname include:

 (born 1973), Japanese manga artist
 (born 1987), Japanese footballer
 (born 1983), Japanese footballer

See also
Funatsu Station (disambiguation), multiple train stations in Japan

Japanese-language surnames